Shungo (written: 峻吾, 峻護, 駿吾 or 俊吾) is a masculine Japanese given name. Notable people with the name include:

, Japanese pornographic film director, screenwriter and producer
, Japanese mixed martial artist
, Japanese jazz guitarist
, Japanese footballer

Japanese masculine given names